Anna Karin Pilsater (born 24 June 1960) is a Swedish politician with the Liberal People's Party. She has been a member of the Riksdag since 1991, representing Stockholm County, and her party's spokesperson on economic policy since January 2002.

Karin Pilsäter was born in Vantör in southern Stockholm. She studied at the Stockholm School of Economics 1984–1988. Before her involvement in politics she has worked as shop assistant, cashier, economic secretary, accountant and as economic chief.

She lives in Tullinge with her husband and their three children.

External links
Karin Pilsäter at the Liberal People's Party
Karin Pilsäter at the Riksdag
Interview in Jusek, October 3, 2002. 

1960 births
Living people
Politicians from Stockholm
Members of the Riksdag from the Liberals (Sweden)
Stockholm School of Economics alumni
Women members of the Riksdag
21st-century Swedish women politicians
20th-century Swedish women politicians
20th-century Swedish politicians
Members of the Riksdag 1991–1994
Members of the Riksdag 1994–1998
Members of the Riksdag 1998–2002
Members of the Riksdag 2002–2006
Members of the Riksdag 2006–2010